The Project Hate MCMXCIX (often referred to as TPH) is a Swedish death metal band with influences from electro-industrial music.

History 
The Project Hate MCMXCIX was formed in 1999 by long-time friends Lord K Philipson (formerly of Leukemia, House of Usher, Lame, Toolshed, Torture Division, as well as doing session work as live bassist/guitarist for Candlemass, Vomitory, Dark Funeral and Grave over the years) and Jörgen Sandström (previously of Vicious Art, Krux, Entombed, Grave, Torture Division and live bassist/guitarist for Candlemass, Misery Loves Co, Kongh, to name a few).

TPH recorded a three-song demo in the end of 1998, produced by famous producer Dan Swanö and featuring backing vocals by Entombed A.D. vocalist Lars-Göran Petrov. The demo was sent out to four labels and in 1999 they signed with the Germany-based Massacre Records, making 1999 the official starting year as things took off from there.

In 1998, the band recorded a Philipson-conceived project, Deadmarch: Initiation of Blasphemy, but the album initially never saw the light of day. It has since been mastered by Dan Swanö and was released on Vic Records 30 November 2009, with new album artwork and booklet.

By the end of 1999, The Project Hate recorded their debut album, Cybersonic Superchrist, which was released in the year 2000. During the recording, female singer Mia Ståhl joined the band. Although reviews were positive, the album was not a commercial success since it was not distributed widely.

The following year, the band recorded their second album, When We Are Done, Your Flesh Will Be Ours, in the late Nasum frontman Mieszko Talarczyk's Soundlab Studios. It was released in 2001, but like the first album, was only with difficulty available in stores.

In 2002, Petter S. Freed of 2 Ton Predator joined as a touring guitarist, then as a permanent member; Mia Ståhl was fired and replaced with Jonna Enckell; later that year, the band left Massacre Records and signed with Threeman Recordings. A live album was recorded in Helsinki, Finland, titled Killing Hellsinki, which was released in April 2003. Afterwards, the band went back to Soundlab Studios and Mieszko Talarczyk to record Hate, Dominate, Congregate, Eliminate.

In early 2005, the band began recording their fourth studio album, Armageddon March Eternal - Symphonies of Slit Wrists, with Dan Swanö. Michael Håkansson of Evergrey joined the band as a bassist during the recording, and later joined the band full-time. Armageddon March Eternal was released by Threeman Recordings in October 2005.

In 2006, the band left their record label and eventually signed with Peter Stormare's record label, StormVox. The band added drummer Daniel Moilanen for their upcoming album, to have live drums for the first time since the band's creation. The fifth studio album, In Hora Mortis Nostræ, was released September 2007. Distribution deals were being sorted in the remainder of 2007 to get the album out as widely as possible, with little success.

In July 2009, the band released its sixth full-length studio album The Lustrate Process on Vic Records.

2010 brought about a change within the band as Jo Enckell was relieved from her duties as vocalist, being replaced by ex-Witchbreed's Ruby Roque. Bassist, Michael Håkansson was announced as being no longer a part of the band following his absence from the band's previous album 'The Lustrate Process'. The bass from that point has been taken care of by Lord K Philipson. A third member, drummer Thomas Ohlsson was replaced by ex-Vomitory/Torture Division drummer Tobias 'Tobben' Gustafsson.

2014 brought another set of changes to The Project Hate. It was announced that Ruby Roque was relieved from duties, and renowned drummer Dirk Verbeuren would be taking up the drums. The name of the new female singer is Ellinor Asp.

Apart from Philipson, there are no longer any fixed members in the band (only Jörgen Sandström has been there since the beginning with Philipson), but a wide array of musicians are brought in for each recording to help realize Philipson's vision for TPH.

Members

Current musicians 
 Lord K Philipson – guitar, bass, keyboards, programming, backing vocals (1998–present)
 Jörgen Sandström – vocals (1998–present)
 Ellinor Asp – female vocals (2014–present)
 Dirk Verbeuren – drums (2014–present)
 Lasse Johansson – guitar solos (2014–present)

Former musicians 
 Mia Ståhl – female vocals (1999–2002)
 Jo Enckell – female vocals (2002–2010)
 Ruby Roque – female vocals (2010–2013)
 Petter S. Freed – guitar (2002–2008)
 Anders Bertilsson – guitar (2009–2011)
 Michael Håkansson – bass (2005–2010)
 Daniel "Mojjo" Moilanen – drums (2006–2007)
 Thomas Ohlsson – drums (2009–2010)
 Tobben Gustafsson – drums (2010–2013)

Guest musicians 

 Morgan Lundin – backing vocals
 L.G Petrov – backing vocals
 Emperor Magus Caligula – backing vocals
 Rickard Alriksson – backing vocals
 Gustaf Jorde – backing vocals
 Jonas Granvik – backing vocals
 Morten Hansen – backing vocals
 Linus Ekström – backing vocals
 Peter Andersson – backing vocals
 Anders Eriksson – backing vocals
 Lars Levin – backing vocals
 Tobbe Sillman – backing vocals
 Jocke Widfeldt – backing vocals
 Matti Mäkelä – backing vocals
 Peter Stjärnvind – backing vocals
 Jonas Torndal – backing vocals
 Anders Schultz – backing vocals
 Björn Åkesson – backing vocals
 Matte Borg – backing vocals
 Robban Eriksson – backing vocals
 Tommy Dahlström – backing vocals
 Tyra Sandström – backing vocals
 Robert Lundin – backing vocals
 Martin van Drunen – backing vocals
 Christian Älvestam – backing vocals
 Johan Hegg – backing vocals
 Leif Edling – backing vocals
 Jo Bench – backing vocals
 Peter Dolving – backing vocals
 Erik Rundqvist – backing vocals
 Lawrence Mackrory – backing vocals
 Richard Sjunnesson – backing vocals
 Ross Dolan – backing vocals
 Johan Längquist – backing vocals
 Boudewijn Bonebakker – guitar solos
 Sebastian Reichl – guitar and keyboard solos
 Mike Wead – guitar solos
 Pär Fransson – guitar solos
 Henry Pyykkö – guitar solos
 Magnus Söderman – guitar solos
 Danny Tunker – guitar solos
 Henrik Danhage – guitar solos
 Fredrik Folkare – guitar solos

Timeline

Discography

Studio releases

Cybersonic Superchrist (2000, Massacre Records)
When We Are Done, Your Flesh Will Be Ours (2001, Massacre Records)
Hate, Dominate, Congregate, Eliminate (2003, Threeman Recordings)
Armageddon March Eternal – Symphonies of Slit Wrists (2005, Threeman Recordings)
In Hora Mortis Nostræ (2007, StormVox Records)
Deadmarch: Initiation of Blasphemy (recorded in 1998, released in 2009 by Vic Records)
The Lustrate Process (2009, Vic Records)
Bleeding the New Apocalypse (Cum Victriciis In Manibus Armis) (2011, Season of Mist)
The Cadaverous Retaliation Agenda (self-released on Mouth of Belial in 2013)
There Is No Earth I Will Leave Unscorched (self-released on Mouth of Belial in 2014)
Of Chaos and Carnal Pleasures (self-released on Mouth of Belial in 2017)
Death Ritual Covenant (self-released on Mouth of Belial in 2018)
Purgatory (self-released on Mouth of Belial in 2020)
Spewing Venom into the Eyes of Deities (self-released on Mouth of Belial in 2021)

Live recordings
 Killing Hellsinki (live album, 2003)

Web releases
 "The Innocence of the Three-Faced Saviour" (web-single, 2007)

References

External links

Musical groups established in 1998
Swedish industrial music groups
Swedish melodic death metal musical groups
Industrial metal musical groups
Season of Mist artists